Margaret Elizabeth Cousins (née Gillespie, also known as Gretta Cousins; 7 November 1878 – 11 March 1954) was an Irish-Indian educationist, suffragist and Theosophist, who established All India Women's Conference (AIWC) in 1927. She was the wife of poet and literary critic James Cousins, with whom she moved to India in 1915. She is credited with preserving the tune of the Indian National Anthem Jana Gana Mana based on the notes provided by Tagore himself in February 1919, during Rabindranath Tagore's visit to the Madanapalle College. She was a member of the Flag Presentation Committee which presented the National Flag to the Constituent Assembly on 14 August 1947.

Life
Margaret Gillespie, from an Irish Protestant family, was born at Boyle, County Roscommon, and educated locally and in Derry. She studied music at the Royal University of Ireland in Dublin, graduating in 1902, and became a teacher. As a student she had met the poet and literary critic James Cousins, and she married him in 1903. The pair explored socialism, vegetarianism, and psychical research together. In 1906, after attending a National Conference of Women meeting in Manchester, Cousins joined the Irish branch of the NCW. In 1907 she and her husband attended the London Convention of the Theosophical Society, and she made contacts with suffragettes, vegetarians, anti-vivisectionists, and occultists in London.

Cousins was a vegetarian and was a speaker for the Vegetarian Society in 1907. She was also involved with the Irish Vegetarian Society. Cousins co-founded the Irish Women's Franchise League with Hanna Sheehy-Skeffington in 1908, serving as its first treasurer. In 1910 she was one of six Dublin women attending the Parliament of Women, which attempted to march to the House of Commons to hand a resolution to the Prime Minister. After 119 women marching to the House of Commons had been arrested, 50 requiring medical treatment, the women decided to break the windows of the houses of Cabinet Ministers. Cousins was arrested and sentenced to a month in Holloway Prison.

Vacationing with W. B. Yeats in 1912, Cousins and her husband heard Yeats read translations of poems by Rabindranath Tagore. In 1913, breaking the windows of Dublin Castle on the reading of the Second Home Rule Bill, Cousins and other suffragists were arrested and sentenced to one month in Tullamore Jail. The women demanded to be treated as political prisoners, and went on hunger strike to achieve release.

In 1913, she and her husband moved to Liverpool, where James Cousins worked in a vegetarian food factory. In 1915 they moved to India. James Cousins initially worked for New India, the newspaper founded by Annie Besant; after Besant was forced to dismiss him for an article praising the Easter Uprising, she appointed him Vice-Principal of the new Madanapalle College, where Margaret taught English.

In 1916, she became the first non-Indian member of the Indian Women's University at Poona. In 1917 Cousins co-founded the Women's Indian Association with Annie Besant and Dorothy Jinarajadasa. She edited the WIA's journal, Stri Dharma. In 1919–20 Cousins was the first Head of the National Girls' School at Mangalore. In 1922, she became the first woman magistrate in India. In 1927, she co-founded the All India Women's Conference, serving as its President in 1936.

In 1932, she was arrested and jailed for speaking against the Emergency Measures. By the late 1930s she felt conscious of the need to give way to indigenous Indian feminists:

She was a member of the Flag Presentation Committee, which was a committee of 74 Indian women led by Hansa Mehta at the Constituent Assembly. The committee presented the National Flag of India on behalf of the women of India to the House on 14 August 1947.

A stroke left Cousins paralysed from 1944 onwards. She received financial support from the Madras government, and later Jawaharlal Nehru, in recognition of her services to India. She died in 1954. Her manuscripts are dispersed in various collections across the world.

Works
 The Awakening of Asian Womanhood, 1922
 The music of Orient and Occident; essays towards mutual understandings, 1935
 Indian womanhood today, 1941
 (with James Cousins) We Two Together, Madras: Ganesh, 1950

See also
List of suffragists and suffragettes
List of women's rights activists
Timeline of women's rights (other than voting)
Timeline of women's suffrage
Women's suffrage organisations

References

Further reading
 
 
 
 
 
 
 
 
 
 
 
 
 

1878 births
1954 deaths
19th-century Irish women writers
19th-century Indian women writers
19th-century Indian writers
20th-century Irish women writers
20th-century Indian women writers
20th-century Indian writers
Hunger Strike Medal recipients
Indian feminists
Indian people of Irish descent
Indian suffragists
Indian Theosophists
Indian women's rights activists
Irish emigrants to India
Irish feminists
Irish suffragists
Irish Theosophists
Irish vegetarianism activists
Irish women's rights activists
People from Boyle, County Roscommon
People from Chennai
Women Indian independence activists